USS Chittenden County (LST-561), originally USS LST-561, was an  built for the United States Navy during World War II. Later named for Chittenden County, Vermont, she was the only U.S. Naval vessel to bear the name.

LST-561 was laid down on 24 February 1944 at Evansville, Indiana by the Missouri Valley Bridge and Iron Company; launched on 25 April 1944. sponsored by Miss Marie Meier; and commissioned on 15 May 1944.

Service history
During World War II, LST-561 was assigned to the European Theater and participated in the invasion of southern France in August and September 1944. She was decommissioned on 30 April 1946.

Due to the outbreak of the Korean War, the ship was recommissioned on 18 September 1950 and assigned to Commander, Amphibious Force, U.S. Pacific Fleet. She participated in the United Nations effort in Korea and performed services in the Far East, the Arctic, and off the United States West Coast. On 1 July 1955 she was redesignated USS Chittenden County (LST-561). The tank landing ship was decommissioned again on 2 June 1958.

Struck from the Naval Vessel Register on 27 June 1958, Chittenden County was sunk as a target south of Oahu, Hawaii on 21 October 1958.

LST-561 earned one battle star for World War II service and two for Korean War service.

See also
 List of United States Navy LSTs

References

 
 

LST-542-class tank landing ships
World War II amphibious warfare vessels of the United States
Cold War amphibious warfare vessels of the United States
Korean War amphibious warfare vessels of the United States
Chittenden County, Vermont
Ships built in Evansville, Indiana
1944 ships
Ships sunk as targets
Maritime incidents in 1958
Shipwrecks in the Pacific Ocean